They All Fall Down is the third full-length album by Burlington, Ontario's The Creepshow released by Stomp Records. The album was released on August 5, 2010 in Compact Disc format and January 4, 2011 as LP.

Track listing
 "The Sermon III" - 0:50
 "Get What's Coming" - 2:25
 "Someday" - 2:57
 "They All Fall Down" - 2:29
 "Last Chance" - 1:45
 "Sleep Tight" - 3:55
 "Dusk 'Til Dawn" - -2:49
 "Keep Dreaming" - 2:57
 "Hellbound" - 2:53
 "Going Down" - 2:44
 "Road to Nowhere" - 3:50

Reception

The Album has received fair to strong ratings from the punk community. The site Chart Attack rated it 3.5/5.

References

External links
thecreepshow.org
Revolver Photography
Ghoulish Gary

2010 albums
The Creepshow albums